Pappert is a surname. Notable people with the surname include:

Jerry Pappert (born 1963), American judge
 Johannes Pappert, Kraan band member
Michael Pappert (born 1957), German basketball player